Denis Hardy (27 January 1936 – 12 May 2016) was a Canadian Liberal Quebec politician.

He was born in Sainte-Thérèse, Quebec to Hervé Hardy and Jeanne Lafleur. He studied law and political science at the University of Montreal and went on to practice law. He then became a professor of law and political science at Collège Lionel-Groulx.

He was elected as the member of the National Assembly of Quebec for Terrebonne in 1965 and was defeated for re-election the next year. He was then elected to the same position in 1970 and 1973, serving from 1970 until 1976. He was the body's Vice President from 1970 until 1973.

Hardy married Rosemère Caron in 1969. After retiring, he held many civic positions and practiced law with the firm of Duquette and Hardy.

References

1936 births
2016 deaths
People from Sainte-Thérèse, Quebec
Quebec Liberal Party MNAs
Vice Presidents of the National Assembly of Quebec